Peter Hose (pronounced José), also known as the "Hula Cop" (September 29, 1881 – January 4, 1925), was the first Honolulu police officer of African descent. He became known for his hula-style of directing traffic.

Early life
Peter Hose was born Kahauiki, Oahu, September 29, 1881. His father was a Portuguese citizen from Cabo Verde.

Family
Hose married Hattie Hose and adopted her son, he had at least a child by her.

The Hula Cop
Hose joined the Honolulu Police Department becoming the first African on the force. As a traffic cop directed traffic in a Hula-style. He was known for his friendliness toward his colleagues and bystanders. Audiences gathered while Hose performed his "traffic hula", amongst them was Charlie Chaplin when he visited in 1917. Hose and Chaplin played a joke on Honolulu by having Chaplin take his place directing traffic, during Chaplin's visit. Hose left the force and became overseer of school janitors, but return to the Department. Hose served in the HPD for 18 years, he died of tuberculosis at his home January 4, 1925 with his family present.

References
Cabo Verde & Hawai'i by Edgar C. Knowlton 
Honolulu by Alan Brennert

African-American police officers
American police officers
People from Hawaii
American people of Cape Verdean descent
American people of Portuguese descent
1881 births
1925 deaths
20th-century African-American people